Sree Vidyanikethan College of Pharmacy (SVCP) was instituted by Sree Vidyanikethan Educational Trust (SVET) in 2004.  Situated in Tirupati, Chittoor district, Andhra Pradesh, India, the pharmacy college was founded by the actor, educationist, former Member of Parliament Dr M Mohan Babu. SVCP has been approved by All India Council for Technical Education (AICTE), New Delhi and affiliated to Jawaharlal Nehru Technological University, Hyderabad (JNTU). SVEP offers various programs including B. Pharmacy, Pharm. D, M. Pharmacy, etc.

References

External links

Universities and colleges in Tirupati
Pharmacy schools in India
Educational institutions established in 2004
2004 establishments in Andhra Pradesh